Feast or Famine is a linguistic Siamese twin that may refer to:

 Feast or Famine (Reef the Lost Cauze album), 2005
 Feast or Famine (Chuck Ragan album), 2007